Ivan Mošić (born 23 December 1994) is a Serbian handball player for HC Ramat HaSharon and the Serbian national team.

He represented Serbia at the 2019 World Men's Handball Championship.

References

External links

1994 births
Living people
Serbian male handball players
Sportspeople from Kragujevac
Expatriate handball players
Serbian expatriate sportspeople in Spain
CB Ademar León players
Liga ASOBAL players